Glebe Place is a street in Chelsea, London. It runs roughly north to south from King's Road to the crossroads with Upper Cheyne Row, where it becomes Cheyne Row, leading down to Cheyne Walk and the River Thames. It also has a junction with Bramerton Street. The street was known as Cook's Ground for some period up to the mid-nineteenth century.

Notable buildings
36, 37 and 38 Glebe Place, an early to mid-19th century terrace are grade II listed houses.

50 Glebe Place looks much older, but was actually built between 1985 and 1987 for the advertiser Frank Lowe and described in  The London Compendium as a folly.

Glebe House, with a Georgian facade, but completely rebuilt inside, contains 13 artworks commissioned from the Georgian artist Tamara Kvesitadze.

West House is a Queen Anne revival house at 35 Glebe Place, built in 1868–69 by the architect Philip Webb, on behalf of the artist George Price Boyce.

Notable residents
Several artists have had studios in the street, including Augustus John and Winifred Nicholson.
Others have also lived here.

No.1
 Francis Bacon  
No.3
 David Jones (artist-poet)
 Tom Burns (publisher)
No.10
 Dora Meeson Also at No.52
 George James Coates. Also at No.52
No.12
 Paul Robeson
No.18
 Vivienne Bennett
No.19
 Vera Brittain with her friend Phyllis Bentley in 1935
 Winifred Holtby
 Elliott Seabrooke  
 Sir George Catlin (political scientist) 
 Shirley Williams, Baroness Williams
No.25
 Constant Lambert
 George Washington Lambert
No.26
 George Henry (painter)  
No.27 Fontana Studios
 Alfred Egerton Cooper
 Leonard Jennings
 Francis Derwent Wood
No.30
 Will Dyson
 Ruby Lindsay
 R O Morris
No.35 West House, Chelsea
 George Price Boyce
 James Guthrie (artist)
 Edward Arthur Walton
No.36
 Antonia White
No.39 Key House
 Maxwell Armfield
No.40, also Key House
 Conrad Dressler. Also kept studios at No.45 Cedar Studios
No.44
 Charles Conder
No.45, Cedar Studios
 John Galsworthy
No.49
 Charles Rennie Mackintosh
No.52
 Glyn Philpot
 E. H. Shepard
No. 53 Glebe Studios 
 Walter Sickert (before 1894) 
 Sir William Rothenstein (1890-1901)
No. 55 Glebe Studios
 Sir Sidney Nolan Australian modernist painter
No.61
 Frederick Henry Townsend  
No.64
 William McMillan
 Sir Alfred Munnings
No.66
 Anton Dollo
No.69 Turner Studios
 Frank Lynn Jenkins
No.70
 Mervyn Peake

References

External links 

Streets in the Royal Borough of Kensington and Chelsea
Chelsea, London
King's Road, Chelsea, London